Corey Olsen  is a teacher and podcaster known as the Tolkien Professor, best known for his work in new media promoting the works of J.R.R. Tolkien and Anglo Saxon literature. Formerly a professor at Washington College, Olsen now dedicates his time to Signum University, an online learning facility he founded in 2012. 

The Tolkien scholar Jason Fisher called Olsen "a great popularizer of Tolkien, both in and outside the classroom", while The Washington Post described him as "one of the most popular medievalists in America".

Education 

Corey Olsen obtained his B.A in English and Astrophysics from Williams College in 1996, going on to Columbia University where he obtained his M.A. in 1997, MPhil in 2000, and his PhD in medieval literature in 2003.

Academic career

Teaching 

Upon graduation from Columbia University, Olsen obtained teaching positions at Temple University, Columbia, and Nyack College. He then proceeded to his longest standing position to date, Assistant Professor of English at Washington College with a specialty on J.R.R. Tolkien, Arthurian Literature, Chaucer, and Sir Thomas Malory. It was at Washington College that Olsen was first able to teach a literary class on Tolkien. In 2013 Professor Olsen left Washington College to focus on Signum University and the Mythgard Institute, online learning environments offering courses in language and literature, especially on the works of J.R.R. Tolkien, as well as fantasy literature and Germanic philology.

Podcasting 

In June 2009, Olsen launched the Tolkien Professor podcast. The podcast was originally created to explore the works of J.R.R. Tolkien, primarily The Hobbit, with later episodes focusing on The Silmarillion. The podcast achieved over a quarter of a million downloads in its first year alone. It expanded to cover the history of fairy stories and their influence on modern fantasy along with supplementary podcasts on the movie adaptations of the works of Tolkien. The supplementary podcasts, often co-hosted by former students, were recorded under the title Riddles in the Dark. Another infrequent aspect of the Tolkien Professor podcasts was the Tolkien Chat call-in shows. These were hosted through Skype where listeners could call in and ask Olsen questions directly. The shows were then edited and published as podcasts. Olsen published several of his Washington College courses, including Faerie and Fantasy that covered some of the well known works of Middle English such as Sir Orfeo, Sir Launfal, and The Wedding of Sir Gawain and Dame Ragnelle. To go along with his book Exploring J.R.R. Tolkien's "The Hobbit", Olsen published a series of lectures on The Hobbit with chapter reviews and interpretation of its story, poetry, and prose.

Online education 

With the success of his podcasts, Olsen founded the Mythgard Institute and Signum University, where he is now President. These institutes offer a range of classes on Latin, the world of J.R.R. Tolkien, Creative Writing, and fantasy and science fiction literature (such as "The Story of The Hobbit"). Olsen founded Signum University and the Mythgard Institute because "We at Signum University believe that this kind of academic experience should be available to 'everyone, everywhere'." Several of the courses offered at the Mythgard Institute have been made available as free downloads through iTunes U; the first was "The Lord of the Rings 1: The Road Goes Ever On". In 2018, Corey announced that Signum University was to be formally entered for state certification via the New Hampshire Department of Education. Following some days of crowdfunding they raised the $23,720 required, and later in 2018, it began the ascension process, announcing that the New Hampshire Department of Education had accepted the request for Signum University to do business in the state.

Reception 

Jason Fisher, reviewing J.R.R. Tolkien's The Hobbit for Tolkien Studies, called Olsen "a great popularizer of Tolkien, both in and outside the classroom, for which he deserves the Tolkien community's gratitude and congratulations". Fisher described the book as informal and approachable, without academic apparatus, and almost relentlessly thorough. He found it "occasionally insightful" though without providing the "original new reading" promised on the cover. To him, it seemed to be "a crib" for undergraduates or high school pupils studying The Hobbit, offering a "ready-made study guide" for the student and a ready-made lesson plan for the teacher.

In The Washington Post, Daniel de Vise noted that the million downloads of Olsen's podcasts made 'The Tolkien Professor' "one of the most popular medievalists in America". He called Olsen's use of "a smartly branded Web site and a legion of iTunes listeners" an unusual route to success, but certainly unlike the traditional "publish-or-perish" track for scholars seeking tenure. In his view, Olsen was "a new breed of public intellectual" who grew up around computers, and "took up a sort of permanent spiritual residence within Tolkien's imagined Middle-earth". He cites a follower of Olsen's podcasts, Dave Kale, as saying "He is a fantastic lecturer. He's engaging. He draws you in", adding that it costs over $44,000 per year to study at Washington College, but Olsen is effectively giving part of that education away for nothing with his online lectures. Despite that, the college gave Olsen tenure in 2010, something that de Vise called "unusual for a scholar who hasn't published a book".

Publications

References

External links 

 
 Signum University
 Mythgard Institute

Columbia Graduate School of Arts and Sciences alumni
Living people
1974 births
Tolkien studies